Spinipterus moijiri (moijiri Paumari) is a species of driftwood catfish found in the Juruá River, Brazil and Nanay River in Peru, on an expedition in around 2012. At 10 cm long the catfish is roughly four times the size of the other only known member of the genus.

Specimens spend the day in a tight space in rocks and wood, emerging at night to feed. The fish is about 10 cm long, thumb-shaped and has skin patterned with jaguar like rosettes. It has a stumpy face similar to a salamander, prickles on its head. The dorsal and two front fins have saw-like serrations.

References

External links
 Reef To Rainforest Media

Auchenipteridae
Fish of Brazil
Fish of Peru
Taxa named by Luiz A. Rocha
Taxa named by Alberto Akama
Fish described in 2019